Jonathan Hughes may refer to:

Jonathan Hughes (poet) (1721–1805), Welsh poet
Jonathan Hughes (cricketer) (born 1981), Welsh cricketer
Jonathan Hughes (rabbi), British rabbi

See also
John Hughes (disambiguation)